Mike Woods (born May 15, 1952) is an American speed skater. He competed at the 1976 Winter Olympics, the 1980 Winter Olympics and the 1984 Winter Olympics.

References

External links
 

1952 births
Living people
American male speed skaters
Olympic speed skaters of the United States
Speed skaters at the 1976 Winter Olympics
Speed skaters at the 1980 Winter Olympics
Speed skaters at the 1984 Winter Olympics
Speed skaters from Milwaukee